Colonel Nicholas Bayly (1747 – 7 June 1812) was a British soldier and Member of Parliament.

Background
Bayly was the third son of Sir Nicholas Bayly, 2nd Baronet, and Caroline, daughter of Brigadier-General Thomas Paget. 
He was baptised on the 1 Jun 1747 at Llanedwen, Anglesey, Wales.
He was the younger brother of Henry Bayly-Paget, 1st Earl of Uxbridge, and the uncle of Henry Paget, 1st Marquess of Anglesey. The family seat was Plas Newydd.
Press cutting - Oxford Journal 27 June 1812 - Deaths: At Weymouth, aged 64 years, Colonel Nicholas Bayly, brother to the Earl of Uxbridge.

Military and political career
Bayly was a Lieutenant-Colonel in the 1st Foot Guards and after he had begun his political career he was appointed Colonel of the part-time Royal West Middlesex Militia (a regiment in which several of his family also served) on 15 April 1788. He was returned to parliament for Anglesey in 1784, a seat he held until 1790. He was succeeded as MP by his nephew William Paget.

Family
Bayly married Fanny (née Nettlefold). He died in June 1812. Their second son was Gen. Sir Henry Bayly.

References

1749 births
1814 deaths
Grenadier Guards officers
Middlesex Militia officers
British MPs 1784–1790
Members of the Parliament of Great Britain for Welsh constituencies
Younger sons of baronets
Nicholas